Agonopterix iliensis is a moth of the family Depressariidae. It is found in Italy and on Sardinia.

References

Moths described in 1936
Agonopterix
Endemic fauna of Italy
Moths of Europe